Senator Buttars may refer to:

Archibald Buttars (1838–1926), Michigan State Senate
Chris Buttars (1942–2018), Utah State Senate